God Bless Your Black Heart is an album by the band The Paper Chase.

Track listing
The album, according to the liner notes, is separated into "entries"

 At the end of the lyrics of "Dying With Decent Music" in the liner notes, there's a blank "entry" that reads; "Final Entry, See You Soon"

References

2004 albums
The Paper Chase (band) albums
Kill Rock Stars albums